Silvestre Luís Scandián (31 December 1931 –  16 February 2019) was a Brazilian Roman Catholic archbishop.

Scandián was born in Brazil and was ordained to the priesthood in 1958. He served as bishop of the Roman Catholic Diocese of Araçuaí, Brazil, from 1975 to 1981. He then served as coadjutor archbishop of the Roman Catholic Archdiocese of Vitória, Brazil, from 1981 to 1984 and was archbishop of the archdiocese from 1984 to 2004.

Notes

1931 births
2019 deaths
21st-century Roman Catholic archbishops in Brazil
20th-century Roman Catholic archbishops in Brazil
Roman Catholic archbishops of Vitória
Roman Catholic bishops of Vitória